Mowmenai (also Romanized as Mow’menā’ī and Mūmenā'ī) is a village in Mansuri Rural District, Homeyl District, Eslamabad-e Gharb County, Kermanshah Province, Iran. At the 2006 census, its population was 402, in 91 families.

References 

Populated places in Eslamabad-e Gharb County